Paolo Ventura (born 1 April 1996) is an Italian cross country skier who competed at the 2022 Winter Olympics. He trains out of Tesero.

Cross-country skiing results
All results are sourced from the International Ski Federation (FIS).

Olympic Games

Distance reduced to 30 km due to weather conditions.

World Championships

World Cup

Season standings

References

External links

Living people
1996 births
Italian male cross-country skiers
Sportspeople from Trentino
Cross-country skiers at the 2022 Winter Olympics
Olympic cross-country skiers of Italy